The 1983–84 North Carolina A&T Aggies men's basketball team represented North Carolina Agricultural and Technical State University during the 1983–84 NCAA Division I men's basketball season. The Aggies, led by fifth-year head coach Don Corbett, played their home games at the Corbett Sports Center as members of the Mid-Eastern Athletic Conference. They finished the season 22–7, 9–1 in MEAC play to finish in first place. They were champions of the MEAC tournament, winning the championship game over Morgan State, to earn an automatic bid to the 1984 NCAA tournament where they were defeated by Morehead State, 70–69, in the play-in round.

Roster

Schedule and results

|-
!colspan=9 style=| Regular season

|-
!colspan=9 style=| 1984 MEAC tournament

|-
!colspan=9 style=|1984 NCAA tournament

Awards and honors
Joe Binion – MEAC Player of the Year

References

North Carolina A&T Aggies men's basketball seasons
North Carolina
North Carolina AandT
North Carolina AandT Aggies men's basketball
North Carolina AandT Aggies men's basketball